The Nettuno Baseball Club, established in 1945, is situated and based in Nettuno, Italy. The club competes in the Italian Baseball League, with one team competing in the first division (Danesi Nettuno BC) and a second team playing in the second division (Danesi Caffè Neptune). Training and home matches are held at Stadio Steno Borghese. The club currently holds the Italian baseball record for most wins (17).
10,000 capacity Stadio Steno Borghese is their home stadium.

History
The spread of baseball and the craze for it in Nettuno is attributable to the number of U.S. military bases present in the area after the end of World War II. U.S. soldiers stationed at the bases often played baseball and softball and involved many local Italians in their games. One of the Italian baseball pioneers, Alberto Fasano, was a Nettunese. Fasano and his friend Julius Zerella eventually founded Nettuno's first softball team – called Neptune PS. The team's first players were: John Petrelli, Luciano Serpe, Luciano Verlezza, Manrico David, Fulvio Verlezza, Tonino Marcucci and Sergio Serpe. Their official debut was in 1946 in the First Division Male Softball championship against Milan. The nettunesi won by a score of 32–7. Neptune PS won its first title in 1949.

In 1950, Neptune PS became Neptune USMC. In its first championship, the club finished second, with 12 wins out of 14. Over the next four years (1951, 1952, 1953, 1954), Neptune USMC won 4 consecutive championships, making the Lazio region most titled of the Italian championship, with 17 league titles. The team won its first European Cup in 1965, and has since won the Cup five more times. The team won the CEBCup 3 times (1993, 1995 and 2000) and the Italian Cup in 1970, 1995 and 1998. In the 2007 and 2008 seasons, they advanced to the finals seven of the Italian Baseball League Series, but lost the title to the Grosseto BBC in 2007 and the San Marino BBC in 2008.

This club has most of the times made the playoffs, and very often the IBL. The club did not make it to the Playoffs only in 2003. During the 2009 season, the club was defeated on 11 April in a home match against Baseball Godo. The club bought Manuel Gasparri from Bologna, Manny Alexander from Rimini, and other important players from Central America, including Abraham Núñez. Within Europe, Nettuno won the Final Four Barcelona, first defeating Kinheim and then triumphing in an all-Italian final against the Fortitudo Bologna with a result of 1–0, winning the European Champions Cup for the second time in a row.

See also
Stadio Steno Borghese

External links
 Stadium picture
 Club logo

References

Baseball teams in Italy